Motorola Pageboy was the second pager ever produced by Motorola with individual-unit addressing, after the less known 1955 (not 1956 as believed) Pager called "Handie-Talkie Radio Pocket Pager".

The first pager-like system was used in 1921 by the Detroit Police Department. However, the first pager that we would today recognize as such was Motorola's Pageboy I. 

It was introduced in 1964 by the company and could selectively deliver a radio message to a particular individual. It used a high-band VHF frequency (from 150 to 170 MHz), or a UHF frequency (from 464 to 475 MHz), and they ran on a rechargeable 4.4 Volt mercury or 3.6 Volt nickel-cadmium battery (NiCd).

The first implementation of the Pageboy alarm receiver could only give an attention tone, had no display and could not store messages. However, it was portable and notified the wearer that a message had been sent. Later versions of the Pageboy were able to deliver tone & voice.

The Motorola Pageboy used to be very popular with fire brigades as an alarm receiver and, thanks largely to the success of this initial venture, pagers quickly began to replace public announcement systems in hospital and factories. The pager was activated by a 2-tone code, after which a voice message was transmitted. The successor of this device was the Motorola Pageboy II.

See also 

List of Motorola products

Pageboy
Pagers
Products introduced in 1974